The AN/URM-25 signal generator was an electronic vacuum-tube radio-frequency (RF) signal generator used during the 1950s and 1960s by the U.S. Military to test electronic equipment.

History
The AN/URM-25 was part of a series of vacuum tube-based signal generators built for the U.S. military in the early Cold War-era.

Today they are collected and used by vintage amateur radio and antique radio enthusiasts who say they provide reasonably high accuracy and stability for a low cost, with build quality reflecting tough military construction requirements and standards.

Specifications

Frequency output ranges from 10 kHz to 50 MHz with amplitude modulation selectable at 400 and 1,000 Hz. RF level from 0.1 microvolts to 100 millivolts or 2 volts is available depending upon termination load. Output impedance is 50,500 ohms.

Carrier signal generation is performed by a 6AH6 tube with an additional 6AH6 buffer stage followed by a 6AG7 output amplifier. Amplitude modulation at 400 and 1,000 Hz is provided by a 5814A (military 12AU7) oscillator. URM-25x models also contain an internal VTVM (vacuum tube voltmeter) and crystal calibration.

The carrier frequency can be set by interpolation using the graduated dial. Additionally, the URM-25's have a BNC connector for constant 200 mV output that can be connected to a frequency meter to display frequency accurately. A sufficient warm-up period is required to ensure the best stability at higher frequencies.

The cabinet cover includes accessories such as an impedance adapter, fixed attenuator and antenna simulator. Additional accessory kit MK-288 includes adapters and more dummy loads.

Models and differences
"URM" indicates general utility, radio, and maintenance and test assembly. The URM-25 units were released in several series from 25A through 25J; some differ substantially in both circuitry and configuration. It is common to find units having differing identification tags; i.e. front face tag may differ from the cabinet tag. Additionally, some units have additional minor circuitry that do not show up on the schematic.

Overhauling
Some present-day electronic hobbyists say the URM-25 series is a good cost-effective choice to use for tuning radio equipment; but overhauling can be tricky and time-consuming. Many say that the model F is easier to work on than the model D, which is in relatively plentiful supply.

See also
 List of military electronics of the United States

References

External links
Example Overhaul: http://www.chuckg.com/urm25d_repairs.htm
Example Overhaul-capacitors, resistor replacement: http://www.wikihow.com/Restore-an-Urm-25D-Signal-Generator

Laboratory equipment
Electronic test equipment
Military electronics of the United States
Military equipment introduced in the 1950s